QI News was an internet television show produced by Quite Interesting Limited, the company which produces the British panel game QI. It
was broadcast on ComedyBox.tv. It was a mock news programme, which instead of broadcasting news stories, broadcast "quite interesting" stories. Other than the stories, the show also played on the characters in it, mainly the two news readers.

Show
QI News was a five-minute long show which reported "quite interesting" things from around the world. It was presented by two newsreaders, brash American Bob Squire (Glenn Wrage) and female Cambridge British co-anchor Sophie Langton (Katherine Jakeways). Other contributions were sometimes provided by correspondent Graham Prince (Robert Meakin). Off-screen, the Producer (Voice of Alexander McConnell) tried to keep Squire and Langton in order.

Each programme ended with one of the characters mentioning a final fact. The other would say, "Is that news?" to which the first responded, "It's news to me". As the credits roll, a disclaimer appeared which read, "All the information in this programme is believed to be true", followed by humorous comments swearing that it is true.

Production
The script for QI News was written by Meakin and Justin Gayner. The research for the show was carried out by QI's "Question Wranglers", John Mitchinson and Piers Fletcher, among others. QI's creator John Lloyd was the executive producer and it was directed by Geoff Posner.

References

QI
British comedy web series